RPCS3 is a free and open-source video game console emulator and debugger for the Sony PlayStation 3 that runs on Windows, Linux, FreeBSD and macOS operating systems, allowing PlayStation 3 games and software to be played and debugged on a personal computer. It is being developed in the C++ programming language targeting x86-64 CPUs and features OpenGL and Vulkan as its backend renderers.

As of December 26, 2022, the emulator is able to run all commercially-released PS3 games, at least to some extent.

Development

Despite the general idea that the complexity of the PlayStation 3's Cell architecture would prevent it from being emulated, RPCS3 released on May 23, 2011, by programmers DH and Hykem as a working emulator. The developers initially hosted the project on Google Code and eventually moved it to GitHub on August 27, 2013. The emulator was first able to successfully run simple homebrew projects in September 2011 and got its first public release in June 2012 as v0.0.0.2.

On February 9, 2017, RPCS3 received its first implementation of a PPE thread scheduler, enhancing its emulation of the many-core Cell microprocessor. On February 16, 2017, RPCS3 gained the ability to install official PlayStation 3 firmware directly to its core file system. In May 2017, it was reported that the implementation of the Vulkan graphics API had shown some performance improvements approaching 400%, pushing several games into "playable" status.

In July 2020, the developers of RPCS3 implemented save states into the emulator. This feature had previously been considered infeasible due to technical limitations.

Requirements
As of August 18, 2022, the emulator requires a 64-bit version of Windows 7 or later, a modern Linux distribution, macOS 11.6 or later, or a modern BSD distribution. The PC must have at least 4 GB of RAM, 8 GB recommended, an x86-64 CPU and a GPU supporting one of the supported graphics APIs: OpenGL 4.3 or greater, or Vulkan, the latter being recommended. Apart from the game itself to be run, the emulator requires the PlayStation 3's firmware, which can be downloaded from Sony's official website.

Atlus DMCA takedown notice
RPCS3 received significant media attention in April 2017 for its ability to emulate Persona 5, achieving playability prior to the game's Western release date. In September 2017, Persona developer Atlus issued a DMCA takedown notice against RPCS3's Patreon page. The action was motivated by the Patreon page making frequent mentions on the emulator's progress on emulating Persona 5. The demand, however, was settled by only removing all Persona 5 references from the page.

See also

 Cemu, the first Wii U emulator
 Citra, the first Nintendo 3DS emulator
 List of video game emulators

References

Cross-platform software
Free video game console emulators
Free software programmed in C++
Free software projects
Linux emulation software
Software that uses Qt
Sony emulators
Windows emulation software